Muskar al Murtafiah is the Ministry of Defence where Royal Army of Oman, Royal Navy of Oman and Royal Air Force of Oman Headquarters is located in Muscat, in northeastern Oman.

References

Populated places in the Muscat Governorate